Borecki (feminine: Borecka; plural: Boreccy) is a Polish surname. Notable people with the surname include:

 Michał Borecki (born 1997), Polish footballer
 Wojciech Borecki (born 1955), Polish football manager

See also
 

Polish-language surnames